Donald Jacoby was an American ice dancer. With partner and wife Andree Anderson, he was the 1958 and 1959 U.S. national champion. They were the 1959 World silver medalists and the 1958 World bronze medalist.

The Jacobys turned professional in 1959 in order to tour with Holiday On Ice.

He was posthumously inducted into the United States Figure Skating Hall of Fame in 1997.

Results

Ice Dance
(with Virginia Hoyns)

(with Andree Anderson)

References

American male ice dancers
Year of birth missing
Year of death missing
World Figure Skating Championships medalists